Mareme Faye is a Senegalese swimmer. At the 2012 Summer Olympics, she competed in the Women's 100 metre freestyle, finishing in 46th place overall in the heats, failing to qualify for the semifinals.

References

1987 births
Living people
Senegalese female swimmers
Olympic swimmers of Senegal
Swimmers at the 2012 Summer Olympics
Senegalese female freestyle swimmers

Sportspeople from Dakar